"If I Didn't Care" is a song written by Jack Lawrence that was sung and recorded by the Ink Spots featuring Bill Kenny in 1939.

Background
The Ink Spots recording became the 10th best selling single of all time with over 19 million copies sold making it one of the fewer than forty all-time singles to have sold 10 million (or more) physical copies worldwide. According to Lawrence, he mailed the song before showing it to some of his friends. His friends' reaction to the song was almost unanimously negative, but he remained positive on it and later it became one of his biggest successes.

History
The recording continues to make a cultural impact as a definitive song of its era, including:
 Was added to the Grammy Hall of Fame, and number 271 on the "Songs of the Century" list.
 As a prominent background track in the popular 2007 video game BioShock.
 In 2018, the Ink Spots' recording of the song was selected for preservation in the National Recording Registry by the Library of Congress as being "culturally, historically, or artistically significant."
 The song appeared in the soundtrack of many films, including:
 Radio Days (1987)
 Men Don't Leave (1990)
 The Shawshank Redemption (1994)
 Get Low (1994)
 Hyde Park on Hudson (2012)

Many other recordings of the song have been made:
 In the 1950s, both the Hilltoppers (No. 17 in 1954)  and Connie Francis (No. 22 in 1959) charted with the song.
 Another notable cover came from the Platters (No. 30, 1961).
 In 1970, the soul group The Moments (later known as Ray, Goodman & Brown) had a hit with the tune that reached No. 44 on the Billboard Hot 100, as well as No. 7 on the Best Selling Soul Singles chart.
 In May 1974, a version recorded by David Cassidy peaked at number 9 in the UK Singles Chart.
 Ska-pop band Madness covered the track on their 1999 album Wonderful.

References

1939 songs
1939 singles
The Ink Spots songs
Grammy Hall of Fame Award recipients
Songs written by Jack Lawrence (songwriter)
United States National Recording Registry recordings
Madness (band) songs
Song recordings produced by Clive Langer
Song recordings produced by Alan Winstanley